Sirkka Norrlund (8 March 1943 – 21 September 2022) was a Finnish hurdler. She competed in the women's 80 metres hurdles at the 1964 Summer Olympics.

References

External links
 

1943 births
2022 deaths
Athletes (track and field) at the 1964 Summer Olympics
Finnish female hurdlers
Olympic athletes of Finland